Janne Vellamo (born 28 September 1984) is a Finnish footballer.

References
Guardian Football

Finnish footballers
FF Jaro players
Veikkausliiga players
Living people
1984 births
Association football midfielders
People from Kaarina
Sportspeople from Southwest Finland